The 2012 United States Senate election in Massachusetts was held in Massachusetts on November 6, 2012, Democrat Elizabeth Warren defeated incumbent Republican Senator Scott Brown. This election was held concurrently with the U.S. presidential election and elections to the U.S. Senate in other states, as well as elections to the House of Representatives and various state and local elections.

Brown ran for re-election to a first full term. He had been elected in a special election in 2010 following the death of incumbent Democratic senator Ted Kennedy. Brown was unopposed in the Republican primary. For the Democrats, an initial wide field of prospective candidates narrowed after the entry of Harvard Law School professor Elizabeth Warren, the architect of the Consumer Financial Protection Bureau. Warren clinched near-unanimous party support, with all but one of the other Democratic candidates withdrawing following her entrance. After winning her party's nomination, eliminating any need for a primary, she faced Brown in the general election.

The election was one of the most-followed races in 2012 and cost approximately $82 million, which made it the most expensive election in Massachusetts history and the second-most expensive in the entire 2012 election cycle, next to the presidential race; this was despite the two candidates' having agreed not to allow outside money to influence the race. Opinion polling indicated a close race for much of the campaign, though Warren opened up a small but consistent lead in the final few weeks. She went on to defeat Brown by over 236,000 votes, 54% to 46%. Despite his loss, Brown received 8.6 percent more of the state vote than Republican Mitt Romney did in the concurrent presidential election. Brown was the only incumbent senator to lose a general election in 2012.

Background 
Democratic U.S. Senator Ted Kennedy was re-elected in 2006, and died on August 25, 2009, from a malignant brain tumor. On September 24, 2009, Massachusetts Governor Deval Patrick appointed longtime friend of Kennedy and former Democratic National Committee chairman Paul G. Kirk to succeed Kennedy until a special election could be held. Kirk's appointment was especially controversial, as the governor's ability to appoint an interim senator was removed during the Romney administration by the Democratic-controlled legislature, as a precaution if senator and presidential nominee John Kerry was elected president in 2004. Laws surrounding Senate appointment were quickly changed following Kennedy's death. The Massachusetts Republican Party sued in an attempt to halt Kirk's appointment, but it was rejected by Suffolk Superior Court Judge Thomas Connolly.

In the special election held on January 19, 2010, Republican state senator Scott Brown defeated Democratic state attorney general Martha Coakley in an upset victory. Brown thus became the first Republican to be elected from Massachusetts to the United States Senate since Edward Brooke in 1972 and he began serving the remainder of Kennedy's term on February 4, 2010.

Republican primary 
The National Republican Trust PAC, a group integral to Brown's 2010 election, vowed to draft a conservative opponent, citing dissatisfaction with his vote in support of the New START nuclear arms treaty. However, Brown went unopposed in the Republican primary.

Candidates 
 Scott Brown, incumbent U.S. Senator

Polling

Results

Democratic primary 
The Massachusetts Democratic Convention was held on June 2, 2012, where Warren received 95.77% of delegate votes. As the only candidate with 15% of delegate votes necessary to qualify for the primary ballot, Warren eliminated her challenger Marisa DeFranco, becoming the de facto nominee. The Democratic primary was held September 6, 2012, with Warren running unopposed.

Candidates

Declared 
 Nominee: Elizabeth Warren, Harvard Law School professor and architect of the Consumer Financial Protection Bureau
 Eliminated at convention: Marisa DeFranco, an immigration lawyer who ran an "unabashedly liberal" campaign

Withdrew 
 Tom Conroy, state representative (withdrew December 12, 2011)
 Alan Khazei, founder of City Year (withdrew October 26, 2011)
 James Coyne King, corporate lawyer (withdrew March 21, 2012)
 Bob Massie, entrepreneur and nominee for Lieutenant Governor of Massachusetts in 1994 (withdrew October 7, 2011)
 Herb Robinson, engineer (withdrew December 15, 2011)
 Setti Warren, Mayor of Newton (withdrew September 29, 2011; endorsed Warren)

Declined 
 Mike Capuano, U.S. Representative
 Kim Driscoll, Mayor of Salem
 Barney Frank, U.S. Representative
 Joseph P. Kennedy II, former U.S. Representative
 Victoria Reggie Kennedy, Ted Kennedy's widow
 Stephen Lynch, U.S. Representative
 Rachel Maddow, television host, and political commentator
 Marty Meehan, former U.S. Representative
 Thomas Menino, Mayor of Boston
 Deval Patrick, Governor of Massachusetts
 John F. Tierney, U.S. Representative
 Warren Tolman, former state senator and former state representative

Polling

Results

General election

Campaign 
On September 14, 2011, Warren declared her intention to run for the Democratic nomination for the 2012 election in Massachusetts for the United States Senate. The seat had been won by Republican Scott Brown in a 2010 special election after the death of Ted Kennedy.

Warren won the Democratic nomination on June 2, 2012, at the state Democratic convention with a record 95.77% of the votes of delegates. She was endorsed by the Governor of Massachusetts, Deval Patrick. Warren and her opponent Scott Brown agreed to engage in four televised debates, including one with a consortium of media outlets in Springfield and one on WBZ-TV in Boston.
Brown ran as a moderate, stressing his ability to cross party lines and highlighting his votes for the Dodd-Frank financial reform law and to repeal "don't ask, don't tell". Warren campaigned on a platform championing the middle class, and supporting Wall Street regulation. Warren criticized Brown for continually voting with Republican leadership, and argued that he was not the bipartisan moderate he claimed to be. A staple of Brown's attack tactics against Warren was his consistent reference to her as "Professor Warren", in attempt to portray her as an elitist academic. Brown faced blowback after the second debate, during which he claimed conservative Antonin Scalia was a "model" Supreme Court Justice, prompting boos from the debate audience.

Warren spoke at the 2012 Democratic National Convention immediately before Bill Clinton on the penultimate night of the convention. Warren contrasted President Obama's economic plan with Mitt Romney's in the 2012 election and rebuked the Republican Party's economic policy stating: "Their vision is clear: 'I've got mine, and the rest of you are on your own.'" Warren positioned herself as a champion of a beleaguered middle class that, as she said, "has been chipped, squeezed and hammered." According to Warren, "People feel like the system is rigged against them. And here's the painful part: They're right. The system is rigged." Warren said that Wall Street CEOs "wrecked our economy and destroyed millions of jobs" and that they "still strut around congress, no shame, demanding favors, and acting like we should thank them." Brown attended the 2012 Republican National Convention, but was not a speaker there. According to Brown, he had rejected an offer to play a larger role, and limited his attendance to a single day because of scheduling demands.

Following Todd Akin's controversial "legitimate rape" comments, Brown was the first sitting senator to demand he drop out of the Missouri U.S. Senate race. He also called on his party to "recognize in its platform that you can be pro-choice and still be a good Republican." Brown's campaign had been endorsed by many Massachusetts Democrats, many of whom were prominently featured in his campaign ads.

In September 2011, a video of Warren explaining her approach to economic policy gained popularity on the internet. In the video, Warren rebuts the charge that asking the rich to pay more taxes is "class warfare", pointing out that no one grew rich in America without depending on infrastructure paid for by the rest of society, stating:

On July 13, 2012, President Obama sparked a controversy when he echoed her thoughts in a campaign speech saying, "Somebody helped to create this unbelievable American system that we have that allowed you to thrive. Somebody invested in roads and bridges. If you've got a business—you didn't build that. Somebody else made that happen."

Warren encountered significant opposition from business interests. In August 2012, Rob Engstrom, political director for the United States Chamber of Commerce, claimed that "no other candidate in 2012 represents a greater threat to free enterprise than Professor Warren." She nonetheless raised $39 million for her campaign, the most of any Senate candidate in 2012.

Native American ancestry controversy 
In April 2012, the Boston Herald sparked an election controversy when it drew attention to Warren's Association of American Law Schools (AALS) directory entries from 1986 to 1995, which listed her as a minority professor. According to the AALS, the directory was compiled by information supplied by law school deans, based on questionnaires filled out by individual teachers. Warren stated that she had self-identified as having Native American ancestry in order to meet others with a similar background. Harvard Law School had listed her as a minority professor in response to criticisms about a lack of faculty diversity, but Warren said that she was unaware of this until she read about it in a newspaper during the 2012 election.

Her opponent Scott Brown speculated that she had fabricated a native ancestry to gain an advantage in the employment market; the Brown campaign used Warren's lineage in several attack ads. In response, Warren's brothers issued a joint statement stating that they "grew up listening to our mother and grandmother and other relatives talk about our family's Cherokee and Delaware heritage". Brian Leiter of the Chicago Law School dismissed the allegations against Warren, noting that law schools have "no pressure to hire Native Americans for affirmative action reasons", and that Warren's record of scholarship was "clearly sufficient to get her appointed at Harvard". Several Brown staffers mocked Warren by doing the "tomahawk chop" at a Brown campaign rally, which Brown said he did not condone.

According to the New England Historical Genealogical Society, several members of Warren's maternal family claim Cherokee heritage; the society found a family newsletter that alluded to a marriage license application that listed Elizabeth Warren's great-great-great-grandmother as a Cherokee, but could not find the primary document and found no proof of Warren's Native American heritage. Some members of the Cherokee Nation protested her claim to Native American ancestry and questioned whether she benefitted from it. Former colleagues and supervisors at the universities where she had worked (including Charles Fried, former Solicitor General under President Ronald Reagan) said Warren's ancestry was either not mentioned, or played no role in her hiring.

The question of Warren's ancestry was pressed by the Brown campaign throughout the election. However, polls showed that most voters said that the controversy would not impact their vote in the election. Warren's 2014 autobiography devoted a section to the allegations, describing them as untrue and hurtful. In 2018, Warren released the results of a DNA test that strongly suggests that she had a Native American ancestor six to ten generations ago, and suggests Warren is between 1/64th and 1/1,024th Native American.

Endorsements

Debates 
Both candidates agreed to four televised debates, three of which were held. The candidates agreed to a fourth debate which was to be held on October 30 in WGBH-TV's studio, hosted by a Boston media consortium, and moderated by John King, but the day before both pulled out due to Hurricane Sandy. Victoria Kennedy, widow of Ted Kennedy, had proposed an additional debate with Tom Brokaw as moderator, however Brown would only accept the invitation if she pledged not to endorse Brown's opponent; which she refused.

Debate 1:
September 20 at WBZ-TV studio, hosted by WBZ and WBZ Newsradio 1030. Moderated by the station's political reporter Jon Keller.
Complete video of debate – C-SPAN

Debate 2:
October 1 at UMass Lowell, co-hosted by UMass and The Boston Herald. Moderated by David Gregory.
 Complete video of debate – C-SPAN

Debate 3:
October 10 at Springfield Symphony Hall, hosted by a Western Massachusetts consortium. Moderated by WGBY-TV's Jim Madigan.
Complete video of debate – C-SPAN

Fundraising 
The election cost approximately $82 million, making it the most expensive election in Massachusetts' history and of any Congressional race in history up to that point as well as the second-most expensive election in the 2012 election cycle, behind only the 2012 presidential election.

The People's Pledge 
Both Warren and Brown stated early in the race that they would not accept television advertisement assistance from Super PACs and interest groups. On January 23, 2012, both candidates signed the agreement, or People's Pledge. While no outside groups were obligated by the agreement, both candidates agreed to donate a sum equal to 50% of an advertisement run by any groups to a charity of the other candidate's choice. The pledge was broken twice, by Brown supporters. In March the American Petroleum Institute and Coalition of Americans for Political Equality launched ads supporting Brown, and as a result, the Brown campaign agreed to make donations of $1,000 and $34,545, respectively, to the charity of Warren's choice: the Autism Consortium.

Top donors 
Contributions by affiliation
Source: OpenSecrets 2012

Contributions by industry
Source: OpenSecrets 2012

Predictions

Polling 

* RV= Registered voters; LV= Likely voters

Results 
Despite the Obama campaign's easy victory in the state, and winning all of the state's counties, this race was fairly close. As expected, Warren performed very well in Suffolk County, which is home to the state's largest city and its capital Boston. Brown performed well in the southern part of the state near Cape Cod. Warren made history by becoming the first Massachusetts woman elected to the U.S. Senate.

By congressional district

Warren won 5 of 9 congressional districts.

Aftermath 
The People's Pledge was a popular concept, which Common Cause proposed being implemented in other races. The pledge also resulted in fewer attack ads on the airwaves.

Less than two months after the election, President Barack Obama nominated Senator John Kerry to become United States Secretary of State. Kerry was sworn in on February 1, making newly inaugurated Warren the state's senior Senator, and the Senate's most-junior senior senator. In the special election to replace Kerry the following year, Democratic nominee Ed Markey asked his Republican rival Gabriel E. Gomez to sign a similar pledge with him, although Gomez refused.

The election was a critical event in both candidates' political careers, with Warren becoming a political icon after entering the Senate, and being drafted to run for president in 2016 and eventually running in 2020. After the election loss, Brown was considered the most prominent Republican in Massachusetts and heavily favored to run in the special Senate election the following year or for Governor in 2014, though he declined to do either. He instead moved to New Hampshire and ran for the Senate there in 2014 against Democratic incumbent Jeanne Shaheen. He lost, 51% to 48%, becoming the first male candidate to lose two Senate races to female candidates.

See also 
 2012 United States Senate elections
 2012 United States House of Representatives elections in Massachusetts
 2013 United States Senate special election in Massachusetts

References

Notes 
A. The Western Massachusetts consortium consists of The Republican, Daily Hampshire Gazette, New England Public Radio, Valley Press Club, Springfield Public Forum, WSHM-LD, WWLP-TV, WGGB-TV, WGBY-TV, Western New England University, and University of Massachusetts Amherst.
B. The Boston media consortium consists of WGBH-TV/WGBH FM, WBUR, New England Cable News, WCVB-TV, WHDH, and The Boston Globe.
C. The organizations themselves did not donate, rather the money came from the organizations' PACs, their individual members or employees or owners, and those individuals' immediate families. Organization totals include subsidiaries and affiliates.

Citations

External links 
 Election Division at the Massachusetts Secretary of the Commonwealth
 Campaign contributions at OpenSecrets
 Outside spending at the Sunlight Foundation
 Candidate issue positions at On the Issues

United States Senate
2012
Massachusetts
Elizabeth Warren